This is a list of characters from the movie Monsters vs. Aliens and its spin-offs.

Monsters
Each of the main five characters are modeled after classic movie monsters.

Susan Murphy (Ginormica)
Susan Murphy (voiced by Reese Witherspoon in films, Riki Lindhome in the TV series), also known in the movie by her monster name Ginormica. In addition to her size, she is particularly strong, physically impervious and has a resistance to energy attacks. She serves as the film's central character. She appears in the Halloween special Monsters vs. Aliens: Mutant Pumpkins from Outer Space. She makes a cameo in a cliffhanger at the beginning of Night of the Living Carrots. She is inspired by the protagonist of Attack of the 50-Foot Woman and her height is specified as just short of fifty feet. In the television series, she gained the ability to switch between her giant and normal sizes by growing and shrinking similar to Ultraman in the Ultra Series.

B.O.B. (Benzoate Ostylezene Bicarbonate)
B.O.B. (Benzoate Ostylezene Bicarbonate) (voiced by Seth Rogen in the film, Chip 'n Dale: Rescue Rangers and specials, Dave B. Mitchell in Madagascar Kartz, Eric Edelstein in the TV series) is an indestructible gelatinous mass. He was created when a genetically altered tomato was injected with a chemically altered ranch dessert topping, the resulting goo gained some form of consciousness. Despite being sentient, he literally and figuratively lacks a brain, and is the main comic relief character. His greatest strength lies in his ability to digest any substance.  In the video game, B.O.B.'s gameplay does not require his arms, and so he lacks them altogether. It is revealed in "Night of the Living Carrots" that he had a fear of carrots due to being force-fed carrot purée in his youth, and at the end of the short was turned into a giant, zombie carrot. He is inspired by The Blob.

Dr. Cockroach, Ph.D.
Dr. Cockroach, Ph.D. (voiced by Hugh Laurie in the film, B.O.B.'s Big Break and Mutant Pumpkins from Outer Space, James Horan in Night of the Living Carrots and video game, Chris O'Dowd in the TV series) is a brilliant but mad scientist who built a pod-like invention to give humans the survival abilities of a cockroach, experimenting on himself. Now he has a giant cockroach head, the ability to climb up walls, and high resistance to physical damage. He has a tendency to eat garbage and laugh maniacally. He is inspired by The Fly.

The Missing Link
The Missing Link (voiced by Will Arnett in the film, video game, B.O.B.'s Big Break, and Mutant Pumpkins from Outer Space, David Kaye in Night of the Living Carrots, Diedrich Bader in the TV series) is a 20,000-year-old fish-ape hybrid who was found frozen and thawed out, only to escape and wreak havoc at his old lagoon habitat. He behaves as a macho jock most of the time, but is out of shape. He is an expert martial-artist and leads the team in attacks. According to director Conrad Vernon, although Link bears an obvious resemblance to Creature from the Black Lagoon, “Link really just represents anything prehistoric that comes back to life and terrorizes people".

Insectosaurus
She is a giant monster silkworm who cannot speak clearly, and is mesmerized by bright lights (usually used to lead her to other locations). For the longest time, Link thought Insectosaurus was a male, but after her emergence from a cocoon, it was discovered she was actually a female. Link can clearly understand what Insectosaurus is saying. As Butterflyosaurus, she has wings, can fly, and becomes the Monsters' mode of transportation. Her characteristics are similar to the giant creature in The Angry Red Planet Godzilla and Mothra.

The Invisible Man
An adaptation of Griffin, from The Invisible Man by H.G. Wells, is mentioned and eventually appears on the apparently empty chair where he died in the film and has a brief cameo in the ending of B.O.B.'s Big Break. He is voiced by Mike Mitchell.

Man-Beast
The Man-Beast is a werewolf that was originally meant to join Team Monster.

Zombies
A horde of zombies were captured during an outbreak, but they never became members of Team Monster.

Aliens
The aliens and alien robots from the movie and TV show are listed here.

Gallaxhar
Gallaxhar (voiced by Rainn Wilson) is an evil alien overlord who hopes to take over Earth.

Gallaxhar's Computer
Gallaxhar's Computer (voiced by Amy Poehler) is a user-friendly computer that follows his orders.

Giant Robotic Probe
Artificially intelligent robots onboard Gallaxhar's ship sent to Earth after the quantoinum was detected.

Mutant Pumpkins
The Mutant Pumpkins are the antagonists of Mutant Pumpkins from Outer Space. They were created by an unknown alien that saturated Farmer Jeb's pumpkin patch with a green mutagenic substance.

Zombie Carrots
The Zombie Carrots are the antagonists of Night of the Living Carrots. Created when Link absentmindedly scares a surviving pumpkin that was standing over a carrot patch in the garden of Ginormica's parents' home, causing a carrot to absorb the same green goo that mutated the pumpkins and turn into a zombie carrot.

Sqweep's Teacher
Sqweep's Teacher is a minor character seen on a few episodes.

Pip
Pip is Sqweep's financial planner, working for Epsilon-11 Allowance Management. He is the same species as Sqweep in dark blue. He came to Earth to collect payment after the monsters and Coverton spent a large amount of money from Sqweep's piggy bank account.

Zed-7 Epsilon Attack Plushy Toy
An aggressive plushy that appears in "The Toy from Another World".

Leprechaun
Leprechaun is a small luck granting indestructible alien known as a Leprechonian that has anger-management issues. It was originally believed by Monger, Coverton, and the other monsters to be classified as a monster which Link uses to gain good luck.

The Internet
The Internet is an alien who is literally the Internet.

Coverton
Coverton (voiced by Jeff Bennett) is a psychokinetic alien who is the main antagonist of the TV series that uses a floating chair for transportation. He is the team leader of Team Alien.

Coverlord
Coverlord (or Grand Coverlord) is the true main antagonist of the television series, who wishes to take over Earth. He sends Coverton to Earth. Coverlord is seen as a mute, faceless, green cloud.

Sqweep
Sqweep (voiced by Haley Tju) is an adorable, intelligent alien child who has come to Earth to write a report on Earth's dominant species for school.

Sta'abi
Sta'abi (voiced by Gillian Jacobs) is a hotheaded female alien from a warrior/hunting culture and Link's love interest. Highly aggressive and quick to take matters into her own hands, she is offended by apologies and answers best to aggression. She also fails to understand certain Earth customs, such as emotions.

Vornicarn
A rambunctious semi-sentient alien, Vornicarn hatched on Earth and briefly incubated inside Link's nose before emerging, rampaging around Area Fifty-Something until Sta'abi captured and tamed him to be her loyal hunting companion.

Space Monsters and the unidentifiable

Zombie Moon Ape
When the monsters are watching a horror film called Attack Of The Zombie Moon Ape, Sqweep watches it in secret to gain extra credit. Becoming sleep-deprived because of it, Sqweep invents a memory extractor to extract the memory of the Moon Ape, which escapes into reality where it terrorizes Area fifty-Something.

Smarty
A smartphone Dr. Cockroach brings to life and adopts as his own son.

Robots
Robot characters  Aero Tank and Unstoppabot appear in some episodes.

Humans

General Warren R. Monger
General Warren R. Monger (voiced by Kiefer Sutherland in the film, Fred Tatasciore in the video game, Kevin Michael Richardson in the TV series) is a military leader who runs a top secret facility where monsters are kept. He plans to fight the invading aliens with the imprisoned monsters.

President Hathaway
President Hathaway (voiced by Stephen Colbert in the film, James Patrick Stuart in the TV series) is the impulsive and dim-witted President of the United States. He doesn't appear in Monsters vs. Aliens: Mutant Pumpkins from Outer Space, but is seen on a picture frame holding an astronaut helmet.

Derek Dietl
Derek Dietl (voiced by Paul Rudd in the film, Nolan North in the TV series) is a local weatherman and Ginormica's ex-fiancé. He jumps at whatever opportunity he has to boost his career.

Carl Murphy
Carl Murphy (voiced by Jeffrey Tambor) is Ginormica's father.

Wendy Murphy
Wendy Murphy (voiced by Julie White) is Ginormica's mother.

References

Monsters vs. Aliens
Animated characters
Film characters introduced in 2009
Universal Pictures cartoons and characters
Monsters vs. Aliens (franchise)